Hank Lott (born October 7, 1974) is a former Republican member of the Mississippi House of Representatives for the 101st District. First elected in 2011, he entered the lower legislative chamber in January 2012. In 2015, he did not run for re-election. Hank's successor was Brad Touchstone.

References

1974 births
Living people
People from Hattiesburg, Mississippi
Republican Party members of the Mississippi House of Representatives